Erwin Resch (born March 4, 1961 in Mariapfarr) is a former Austrian alpine skier. He won three FIS Alpine Ski World Cup events in his career. In 1982, he finished third in the downhill at the Alpine World Ski Championships.  He also competed in the men's downhill at the 1984 Winter Olympics.

World Cup victories

References

1957 births
Living people
Austrian male alpine skiers
Olympic alpine skiers of Austria
Alpine skiers at the 1984 Winter Olympics